Jona Island is an island off the western coast of Graham Land on the Antarctic Peninsula. It is within the Argentine, British and Chilean Antarctic claims.

The island was mapped from air photos taken by the Ronne Antarctic Research Expedition (1947–48) and the Falkland Islands and Dependencies Aerial Survey Expedition (1956–57). It was named by the UK Antarctic Place-Names Committee for Franco P. Jona, an American (formerly Italian) physicist who in 1951 made an accurate determination of the elastic constant of a single ice crystal.

See also 
 List of Antarctic and sub-Antarctic islands

References

Islands of Graham Land
Loubet Coast